Fadhili Frank Mtanga (born 14 November 1981) popularly known by his pen name Fadhy Mtanga is a Tanzanian creative writer, blogger, photographer, graphic designer and social worker.

Career
He published his first Swahili novel, Kizungumkuti in 2011, that was followed by Huba in 2014 and Fungate in 2017. In 2020, he published his fourth novel Rafu. In August 2020 Fadhy began what he called #TuzoChallenge on his Facebook wall. He challenged other Swahili writers to continue his new story that he titled Tuzo. As the first initiative in the world of literature,  the challenge led to the publication of the very first novel of its own kind going by the same title. Featured by five authors (Fadhy Mtanga, Lilian Mbaga, Maundu Mwingizi, Laura Pettie and Hussein Tuwa), Tuzo that was launched in December 2020.

He also published his first Swahili poetry book Hisia in 2018.

Works 
Kizungumkuti (2011)
Huba (2014)
 Fungate (2017)
Hisia (2018)
Rafu (2020)
Tuzo (2020) with other four Swahili authors

References 

1981 births
Living people
Tanzanian novelists